The Taipei Astronomical Museum is a museum in Shilin District, Taipei, Taiwan.

The museum took over the responsibilities of the Taipei City Observatory. The dome at the museum consists of geometrically identical pieces.

History
The museum was opened on 7 November 1996.

Exhibitions
The museum includes the following exhibition areas:
 Ancient Astronomy
 Celestial Sphere and Constellation Exhibit
 Cosmology
 Space Technology
 Stars Area
 Telescope and Observatory Area
 The Earth
 The Galaxies
 The Solar System

The museum also has a domed theater.

Transportation
The museum is accessible within walking distance northwest from Shilin Station of Taipei Metro.

Asteroid
Asteroid 300300 TAM, discovered by astronomers Hung-Chin Lin and Ye Quan-Zhi in 2007, was named for the Taipei Astronomical Museum. The official  was published by the Minor Planet Center on 9 January 2020.

See also
 List of museums in Taiwan

References

External links

 

1996 establishments in Taiwan
Astronomy museums in Taiwan
Buildings and structures completed in 1996
Domes
Museums established in 1996
Museums in Taipei
Science museums in Taiwan